The 2012 USAC Traxxas Silver Crown Champ Car Series season was the 41st season of the USAC Silver Crown Series. The series began with the Hall of Fame Classic at Indianapolis Raceway Park on May 19, and ended on October 13 at the Sumar Classic at the Terre Haute Action Track. Levi Jones began the season as the defending champion, and Bobby East was the season champion.

Schedule/Results

References

USAC Silver Crown Series
United States Auto Club